ThyssenKrupp Marine Systems of Germany (often abbreviated TKMS) is a group and holding company of providers of naval vessels, surface ships and submarines. It was founded when large industrial conglomerate ThyssenKrupp acquired Howaldtswerke-Deutsche Werft on January 5, 2005.

Composition 

The group consists of:

 Howaldtswerke-Deutsche Werft in Kiel, Germany
 Atlas Elektronik in Bremen, Germany
 Hellenic Shipyards Co. in Skaramangas, Greece (25%)

As of August 30, 2006, the group represented a sales volume of around €2.2 billion and had a workforce of 8,400 people.

It is said that ThyssenKrupp wants to sell its Yards' Business in Emden, Kiel and Hamburg.

Company history 
The corporation opened a branch office in Karachi, Pakistan on 25 July 2007. By January 2009, it had become one of the biggest private shipbuilding companies in Pakistan.

In 2017 the Israeli government made a deal with TKMS about 3 "Dakae-Class" submarines. Benjamin Netanyahu is said to have enforced the submarine business against the will of the military and defense ministry. The government under incumbent Prime Minister Naftali Bennet is planning a committee of inquiry. Several parties involved in the business are being prosecuted for corruption.

References

External links
 

Shipbuilding companies of Germany
Defence companies of Germany
Manufacturing companies of Germany
Military vehicle manufacturers
Holding companies of Germany
Holding companies established in 2005
Manufacturing companies established in 2005
Privately held companies of Germany
Companies based in Kiel
ThyssenKrupp